Kazumi Yamashita may refer to:

 Kazumi Onishi (born 1948), née Yamashita, Japanese figure skater
 Kazumi Yamashita (artist) (born 1959), Japanese manga artist